The Nationalist Party (PN) is one of the two major contemporary political parties in Malta, along with the Labour Party.

It is a Christian-democratic, and conservative political party, and it has been also described as centrist or centre-right on the political spectrum. It is supportive of Malta's membership in the European Union. It is currently in opposition to the Labour Party. Since independence in 1964, the Nationalist Party has won six out of the thirteen general elections, in 1966, 1987, 1992, 1998 and 2003. In 2008 it won with a paper-thin majority of around 1500 votes.

Ideology
Malta's Nationalist Party emerged from the Anti-Reform Party founded by Fortunato Mizzi in 1883, opposing taxation policies decreed by the British authorities and measures to anglicise the educational and judicial systems during the "Language Question" period.

This would lead to the party openly siding with General Franco's fascist army in the Spanish Civil War. This is still seen by the historical iconography that stayed on the party, including the proto-Fascist imagery of the party logo is a shield set against a black background (black being the heraldic colour chosen by Mussolini, as evidenced by his "Blackshirts"), the PN's official anthem, which is still sung during mass meetings, being similar to the official anthem of Mussolini's Fascist party, "La Giovinezza", and also the name of the party itself, which in itself includes the term nazionale for the first time, which was inspired by Italian nationalism.

The party supported human rights, so long as they were in line with Roman Catholicism. In 2011 it was noted that its party platform was "far to the right of most other Christian Democratic parties, the Bavarian Christian Social Union in Germany included". In the following years, the party moved towards more centrist positions and became more progressive. The Nationalist Party opposed the introduction of divorce in Malta in 2011. However, since then, it has changed to a position of support for it and for other liberal ideas.

Factions within the Nationalist party do not tolerate LGBT rights statutes; despite this, the majority of its parliamentary group voted in favour of gay marriage in 2017. The party has become very diverse in the last few years. The party calls itself a mosaic of people and ideologies. The party recruited a non-binary member, Mark Josef Rapa, for their pro-LGBT group, FOIPN, and a transgender member, Freddie Gerada, for their youth group, Team Start. Apart from that, there is a growing number of LGBT and openly pro-choice people in the party.

A clause in the party statute dating back to 1991 bans active or former Freemasons from taking active roles, including casting a democratic vote, within the parameters controlled by the party itself.

Party structure
The Party structures are the General, Executive and Administrative Councils, the Parliamentary Group, the District Fora and Sectional Committees, the College of Local Councillors and a number of Party branches.

Party officials include the Leader, two Deputy Leaders, Secretary-General, President of the Party's General Councils and Presidents for each of the Executive and Administrative Committees, Treasurer, International Secretary and Parliamentary Group Whip.

The General Council is made up of delegates and representatives from other Party structures, the largest number being delegates elected by the Sectional Committees. The General Council elects and approves the Party Leader and two Deputy Leaders, approves the electoral programme, approves the Secretary-General's report on the state of the Party and amends the Party Statute. The executive committee is made up of the Party's most senior officials, representatives of the General Council, the Parliamentary Group, Sectional Committees and the Party branches. The executive committee is the political and policy making body of the Party and, amongst other things, elects most of the Party officials, approves candidates, drafts the electoral programme and lays out the broad policy guidelines. The Administrative Committee is made up of Party officials, Presidents of all of the Party's branches and deals with organisational and administrative issues.

The Party is organised geographically in Sectional Committees which are then organised in District Fora with special provisions applying for Party organisation in Gozo. The Parliamentary Group and the College of Local Councillors bring together the Party's elected representatives in parliament and local councils. The Party's branches include an equal opportunities section, as well as youth, women's, seniors, workers, professionals, entrepreneurs, local councillors, candidates and former MPs sections.

Media holdings
Although not directly part of the Party's structure, the Party owns the television station NET Television, the online news portal netnews.com.mt, Net FM radio station, and the In-Nazzjon and Il-Mument newspapers through its holding company Media.link Communications.

History

Foundation and early years (1880–1918)

The Nationalist Party's roots lie in the important language question of the late 19th century, when the colonial government in Malta tried to give the English language the importance Italian had held in schools, administration, and law courts. Fortunato Mizzi, who was a lawyer at the time, strongly opposed these reforms, and in 1880, he set up the "Partito Anti-Riformista" (Anti-Reform Party). He and his followers also wanted a better constitution for the island, as the one imposed at the time had been granted by governor Richard More O'Ferrall in 1849, and gave the Maltese little power. This was because the governor was to appoint more members to the council of government than there were to be elected by the voters.

Against the Anti-Reform Party stood the Reform Party, founded by Sigismondo Savona in 1879. The Reform Party was in favour of the language reforms being imposed.

In 1886, Fortunato Mizzi, together with Gerald Strickland (another anti-reformist at the time), went to London to demand a new constitution for the islands, which would give them representative government. This constitution was granted in 1887 (known as the Knutsford Constitution), and added more elected members to the council of government than official (appointed) members.

During the next few years, the party was divided between abstentionists and anti-abstentionists. The abstentionists would immediately resign their post in the Council of Government immediately upon election as a protest against the token representation of the electorate on the council; the anti-abstentionists favoured co-operation with the colonial authorities in order to work for a better constitution.

This practice of abstentionism led to the 1887 constitution being withdrawn, and in 1903, a new one was given instead, similar to that of 1887.

Interwar period (1918–39)

Following the First World War a broader and more moderate coalition, the Maltese Political Union (UPM), was formed but a more radical and pro-Italian group, the Democratic Nationalist Party (PDN), split from the main party. The two groups contested the first legislative elections of 1921 but in separate constituencies so as not to damage each other's chances. However, after elections the UPM, which emerged as the largest Party in the Legislative Assembly, chose Labour as its coalition partner.

The parties again contested the 1924 elections separately although this time they did form a coalition, eventually merging in 1926 under the old name of Nationalist Party. It lost its first elections as a re-unified Party in 1927 to the "Compact", an electoral alliance between the Constitutional Party and Labour.

A constitutional crisis, resulting from a dispute between the Church and the Constitutional Party, meant that elections were suspended in 1930. They were held again in 1932 when the Nationalists emerged victorious (21 seats out of 32). However, the Nationalists did not last long in government. The colonial authorities, concerned at the rise of fascist Italy in the Mediterranean and Africa, suspended the government and the constitution on the pretext that government's measures to strengthen instruction of Italian in schools violated the Constitution.

The Second World War and postwar period (1939–64)
The Nationalists received what could have been their coup de grâce during the War. Their association with Italy, the wartime enemy, antagonised them with the electorate, and their leader Enrico Mizzi (son of Fortunato) was first interned and then exiled to Uganda during the War along with other supporters of the Party. The Party did not even contest the 1945 elections for the Council of Government which for the first time raised the Labour Party from third-party status to that of a major party at the expense of the Constitutionals.

Notwithstanding, the Nationalist Party survived and in its first major electoral test, the legislative elections of 1947, it managed to stay ahead of various splinters that had formed from people who did not want to be associated with the main party. In the following 1950 elections, a very damaging split occurred in the ranks of the governing Labour Party resulting in two parties: the Malta Labour Party (MLP) and the Malta Workers' Party (MWP). This helped the Nationalists become the largest party in the Legislative Assembly and form a minority government which, though short-lived, re-established the Nationalist Party as a major political party. Enrico Mizzi was sworn in as Prime Minister, but died after three months in December.

Two subsequent elections were held in 1951 and 1953 where the Nationalists formed short-lived coalitions with the Malta Workers Party (which, over the years, eventually disintegrated). The Party lost the 1955 elections to Labour and the following years it led the campaign against the Labour Government's proposal for integration with Britain. Integration failed largely because Britain lost interest after the Suez fiasco and the constitution was again revoked in 1958 following massive disturbances over redundancies at the Malta Drydocks.

Post-independence (1964–2013)

A new constitution was enacted in 1961. The Nationalists, led by George Borg Olivier won the 1962 elections, fought largely over the issue of independence and having as a backdrop a second politico-religious crisis this time between the Church and the Labour Party. Independence was achieved in 1964 and the Party was returned to office in elections in 1966. It lost the 1971 elections by a narrow margin and lost again in 1976.

In the elections of 1981 the party, led by Eddie Fenech Adami achieved an absolute majority of votes for the first time since 1933 but it did not gain a parliamentary majority and so remained in the opposition. A crisis followed with the party MPs refusing to take their seats. Amendments to the constitution in 1987 meant that the party was voted into office that same year after 16 years in opposition.

In 1990 the government formally applied to join the European Community. A wide-ranging programme of liberalisation and public investments meant the return to office with a larger majority in 1992. However, the party was defeated in the 1996 elections. The stint in opposition would last only 22 months as the government soon lost its one-seat majority. The party won the 1998 elections convincingly, a feat that was repeated in 2003 following the conclusions of accession negotiations with the European Union in 2002.

The Nationalist Party proposed Malta's accession to the European Union, a question which was put forward in the 2003 Maltese European Union membership referendum. Those in favour were 53% of eligible voters, a result that prompted the 2003 snap election in order to confirm the mandate. Malta joined the European Union in 2004.

The Nationalist Party won narrowly the general election of 2008. It lost the 2013 election and is currently in opposition.

Opposition period (since 2013)

After the most recent Nationalist government, led by Lawrence Gonzi, lost its majority in parliament in the final year of the legislature, the same government fell when the budget vote (also a vote of confidence) was defeated, thus meaning it was the first Nationalist government since Independence to fall from power.

After approximately 23 years in government (With Labour's short 2-year stint between 1996 and 1998 being in between two stints of PN governance) the Nationalist Party took a major defeat in the Maltese general elections of 2013, losing several districts and resulting in a nine-seat deficit in parliament between it as the opposition and the elected Government. the win is considered to have been the biggest victory any party has had since Malta's Independence with the opposing Labour party taking 55% of the votes with a difference of 35,000 votes between the two parties.

The Nationalist Party again suffered a loss in the European Parliament election of 2014 against the governing Labour Party by over 34,000 votes,  but managed to elect its third MEP for the first time since Malta's entrance in the EU, namely Roberta Metsola, David Casa and Therese Comodini Cachia.

In the 2015 local council elections, the Nationalist Party increased its vote percentage from 41% in 2012 to 45%.

In the lead-up to the 2017 general election the Nationalist Party negotiated for a coalition with two never-elected third parties in Malta, all under the campaign Forza Nazzjonali: the newly formed centre-left Democratic Party (PD) and the green Democratic Alternative (AD). Under an agreement reached with PD leader and former Labour and Nationalist MP Marlene Farrugia, PD candidates contested the 2017 general election under the Nationalist banner with the added notation "tal-orange" (referring to the PD's party colour) and any elected PD members would participate in a future Nationalist-led government. Negotiations with the AD were unsuccessful due to the AD wanting all three parties to run candidates under a new name, Qawsalla ("Rainbow"), with unified policy platforms rather than simply as Nationalists with an added notation.

The Party formed a coalition list called Forza Nazzjonali together with the Democratic Party. Nevertheless, this was not successful and the party, under Forza Nazzjonali, was defeated again in the 2017 snap election.

After the election, Simon Busuttil resigned from the position of leader of the party alongside the deputy leaders of his administration. A new election for the leadership role was decided in which for the first time, paid PN supporters can vote as well as the executive. The four candidates in the first round were Adrian Delia, Chris Said,  Alex Perici Calascione and Frank Portelli. Alex Perici Calascione and Frank Portelli were the two candidates who did not pass through the first phase. In the second round Adrian Delia emerged as the winner of the leadership election, in which he gained 7,734 votes (52.7% of the vote),  to Said's 6,932 votes.

In Adrian Delia's first European election as party leader in 2019 the party took an even bigger defeat than before, with a 43,000 vote difference separating the two parties. this would lead to the party losing another seat while the Labour party gained another seat.

Former Speaker of the House of Representatives of Malta Louis Galea has suggested that the party rebrand, possibly under the new name People's National Party, in order to avoid association with other contemporary "nationalist" parties in Europe, which tend to be positioned on the far-right.

Roberta Metsola, a member of PN, was elected President of the European Parliament in January 2022 following the unexpected death of David Sassoli.

The Party suffered a third consecutive defeat in the 2022 general election.

Leaders
1880–1905 Fortunato Mizzi
1905–1926 Enrico Mizzi
1926–1942 Sir Ugo Pasquale Mifsud (Prime Minister: 1924–1927, 1932–1933) and Enrico Mizzi
1940–1950 Enrico Mizzi (Prime Minister: 1950)
1950–1977 Giorgio Borg Olivier (Prime Minister: 1950–1955, 1962–1971)
1977–2004 Eddie Fenech Adami (Prime Minister: 1987–1996, 1998–2004)
2004–2013 Lawrence Gonzi (Prime Minister: 2004–2013)
2013–2017 Simon Busuttil
2017–2020 Adrian Delia
2020–present Bernard Grech

Electoral history

House of Representatives

European Parliament

See also
 Media.link Communications, the communications holding company of the party

References

External links
  

 
Catholic political parties
Christian democratic parties in Europe
Political parties in Malta
Political parties established in 1880
International Democrat Union member parties
1880 establishments in Malta
Member parties of the European People's Party
Maltese nationalism
Conservative parties in Malta